In mathematics, a complex geodesic is a generalization of the notion of geodesic to complex spaces.

Definition
Let (X, || ||) be a complex Banach space and let B be the open unit ball in X. Let Δ denote the open unit disc in the complex plane C, thought of as the Poincaré disc model for 2-dimensional real/1-dimensional complex hyperbolic geometry. Let the Poincaré metric ρ on Δ be given by

and denote the corresponding Carathéodory metric on B by d. Then a holomorphic function f : Δ → B is said to be a complex geodesic if

for all points w and z in Δ.

Properties and examples of complex geodesics
 Given u ∈ X with ||u|| = 1, the map f : Δ → B given by f(z) = zu is a complex geodesic.
 Geodesics can be reparametrized: if f is a complex geodesic and g ∈ Aut(Δ) is a bi-holomorphic automorphism of the disc Δ, then f o g is also a complex geodesic. In fact, any complex geodesic f1 with the same image as f (i.e., f1(Δ) = f(Δ)) arises as such a reparametrization of f.
 If

for some z ≠ 0, then f is a complex geodesic.
If

where α denotes the Caratheodory length of a tangent vector, then f is a complex geodesic.

References
 

Hyperbolic geometry
Metric geometry